In on-line computer gaming, the Yerfworld can refer to two ages in the game of Myst.

 For the upper Yerfworld, see FurryMUCK.
 For the lower Yerfworld, see Tapestries MUCK.